Le Châble railway station, also known as Le Châble VS, is a railway station in the municipality of Bagnes, in the Swiss canton of Valais. It is the eastern terminus of the standard gauge Martigny–Orsières line of Transports de Martigny et Régions.

In January 2019, the new station was opened after an extensive reconstruction, which lowered the tracks and platforms by 4.5 meters, bringing them underground. The new station has two tracks.

The valley station for a gondola lift to Verbier is adjacent to the station. Local buses to Bruson, Sarreyer and Verbier serve Le Châble station as well.

Services 
 the following services stop at Le Châble:

 Regio: hourly service to Martigny.

References

External links 
 
 

Railway stations in the canton of Valais
Transports de Martigny et Régions stations